Wellington Moisés Ramírez Preciado (born 9 September 2000) is an Ecuadorian footballer who plays as a goalkeeper for Independiente del Valle.

Club career
Born in Guayaquil, Ramírez joined C.S.D. Independiente del Valle's youth setup in 2016, from Toreros FC. He made his first team debut at the age of just 17 on 10 July 2018, starting in a 1–3 away loss against S.D. Aucas.

On 30 January 2019, Ramírez moved abroad and joined Real Sociedad on loan until June; he was initially assigned to the reserves in Segunda División B. His loan was extended until 31 December on 28 June, with a buyout clause, which was declined on 10 December.

Upon returning, Ramírez was assigned back at the main squad, being mainly a backup to Jorge Pinos.

International career
He made his debut for the Ecuador national football team on 7 October 2021 in a World Cup qualifier against Bolivia.

References

External links

2001 births
Living people
Sportspeople from Guayaquil
Ecuadorian footballers
Association football goalkeepers
Ecuadorian Serie A players
C.S.D. Independiente del Valle footballers
Segunda División B players
Real Sociedad B footballers
Ecuador youth international footballers
Ecuador international footballers
Ecuadorian expatriate footballers
Ecuadorian expatriate sportspeople in Spain
Expatriate footballers in Spain
2022 FIFA World Cup players